The 1956 Belgian motorcycle Grand Prix was the third round of the 1956 Grand Prix motorcycle racing season. It took place on 8 July 1956 at the Circuit de Spa-Francorchamps.

500 cc classification

350 cc classification

250 cc classification

125 cc classification

Sidecar classification

References

Belgian motorcycle Grand Prix
Belgian
Motorcycle Grand Prix